The Self Seeker is a 1929 Soviet film directed by Nikolai Shpikovsky.

Plot 
The film takes place in Ukraine during the Civil War. In the center of the plot is Apollo Shmiguev, loyal to all regimes, capable of benefiting from any situation.

Cast 
 Dora Feller-Spikovskaya as Commissar
 Dimitry Kaka as Colonel
 Luka Lyashenko as Head of Partisans
 Ivan Sadovskiy as Apollon Z. Shmyguev 'Shkurnik' (as Ivan Sadovski)
 S. Vlasenko as Chief of bootlegging check-point

References

External links 

1929 films
1920s Russian-language films
Soviet black-and-white films